Knedle (from German knödel, "dumpling"), is a dish of boiled potato-dough dumplings filled with plums or apricots, originating in the Austro-Hungarian Empire. Popular in Central and Eastern European countries, the dish is eaten as dessert, a main dish, or side dish.

Name

Preparation
The dough is made with mashed potatoes, eggs, and flour. The dough is flattened out and cut into squares. The plums (or apricots) are inserted inside the dumplings by hand. Some versions of the dish use noodles instead of potatoes. The preparation can include removing the stone and stuffing the fruit with sugar. The plums are then completely wrapped in dough and dropped in boiling water. When they start floating, they are taken out, sprinkled with sugar, and served. They can also be served with breadcrumbs fried in butter and dusted in powdered sugar.

See also

 List of dumplings
 List of plum dishes

References

Sources

 Dumplings with Plums - Plum Balls - Knedle, retrieved on September 19, 2007.
 Recipe (in Polish) in the "Gazeta" newspaper, retrieved on September 19, 2007.
 Recipe (in Polish) by "wiadomosci24" news service, retrieved on September 19, 2007.

External links

Dumplings
Potato dishes
Plum dishes
Austrian cuisine
Hungarian cuisine
Serbian cuisine
Slovenian cuisine
Croatian cuisine
Czech cuisine
Polish cuisine
Montenegrin cuisine